Richard McCabe (born William McCabe; 18 August 1960) is a Scottish actor who has specialised in classical theatre. He is an Associate Artist of the Royal Shakespeare Company (RSC).

Career
McCabe is an Associate Artist of the Royal Shakespeare Company (RSC), best known for his roles, ranging from comedy (Puck, Autolycus, Thersites, Apemantus) to drama (King John, Iago, Flamineo). He first gained major attention as Puck in the 1989 production of A Midsummer Night's Dream, with a production that featured punk fairies and a scrapyard set. As Autolycus, McCabe entered Act III in The Winter's Tale, hanging from a bunch of huge balloons (1992–93; RST, Barbican, UK and international tour). His first leading part was creating the role of Christopher Marlowe in Peter Whelan's School of Night, a new play commissioned  by the RSC to commemorate the 400th anniversary of Marlowe's death in 1993 (1993–94). Other major roles with the RSC have been the title role in King John (2006; Josie O’Rourke, Swan); Iago opposite Ray Fearon in Othello (1999-2000; Michael Attenborough, RST & Barbican); Flamineo in John Webster’s White Devil (1996–97; Gale Edwards, Swan & The Pit). 

McCabe has also been associated with Chichester's Festival Theatre, playing a range of contrasting roles including the title role in Scapino or The Trickster by Molière (Festival Theatre 2005), directed by Silviu Purcarete. In 2010, McCabe played the critic Moon in The Real Inspector Hound by Tom Stoppard, and Mr. Puff in The Critic by Richard Brinsley Sheridan in a double bill at the Minerva theatre, as well as Jonson in Bingo by Edward Bond that subsequently transferred to the Young Vic.

In 2011 McCabe played Jim Hacker in a nationwide tour of Yes, Prime Minister which then transferred to both the Apollo and Gielgud theatres. He played Tropachov in Fortune's Fool by Turgenev at the Old Vic theatre.

In September and October 2012, he played an older Romeo opposite Kathryn Hunter's Juliet in Ben Power's adaptation of Romeo and Juliet, called A Tender Thing (2009), directed by Helena Kaut-Hausen. He also played Hamlet over a period of three years (1999-2001) for Birmingham Rep's production directed by Bill Alexander. This included appearing at the Hamlet Festival at Elsinore Castle in Denmark in 2001.

On 28 April 2013, McCabe won an Olivier Award as Best Supporting Actor for his role as PM Harold Wilson in the original production of Peter Morgan's The Audience at the Gielgud Theatre. He had previously been nominated for an Olivier Award in 1994 for his role as Autolycus in the 1992 RSC production of The Winter's Tale.

On 7 June 2015, McCabe won the Tony Award for Best Featured Actor in the Broadway production of The Audience, starring Dame Helen Mirren as Queen Elizabeth II. Mirren won the Best Actress Tony Award. He also won awards for Outstanding Featured Actor (Outer Critics' Circle Awards) and Distinguished Performance (Drama League Awards). In 2017, McCabe acted in the role of Major General David Harding in the Bollywood film, Rangoon.

McCabe also played Cicero in the Imperium cycle of plays at the Royal Shakespeare Company in 2017/8.

The 2022 English National Opera production of The Yeomen of the Guard at the Coliseum Theatre, London, featured McCabe as Jack Point.

Other
Described by Michael Billington of The Guardian as "One of our finest actors" and Charles Spencer of The Daily Telegraph as "One of the best actors of his generation", McCabe has received Olivier and Tony Awards.

On television McCabe played Frank Gresham Senior, owner of Greshamsbury Park, in Julian Fellowes' adaptation for ITV of Anthony Trollope's novel Doctor Thorne. He has also appeared in Poldark, Peaky Blinders, all four series of Wallander, Indian Summers, and The Best of Men. On film McCabe has appeared in Eye in the Sky, Mindhorn, The Constant Gardener, Master and Commander, Notting Hill, and Persuasion. Other films include Cinderella, The Invisible Woman, The Duchess, Vanity Fair, and Nightwatching.

Filmography

Films

Television

Awards and honours
1994, nominated as Best Supporting Actor, Olivier Award
2013, won Best Supporting Actor, Olivier Award
2015, won Best Featured Actor in a Play, Tony Award
2015 won Outer Critics Circle Outstanding Featured Actor in a Play
2015 nominated for Distinguished Performance Award, Drama League Awards

References

External links

1960 births
20th-century Scottish male actors
21st-century Scottish male actors
Alumni of RADA
Laurence Olivier Award winners
Tony Award winners
Royal Shakespeare Company members
Scottish male film actors
Scottish male stage actors
Scottish male television actors
Scottish people of French descent
Male actors from Glasgow
Living people